Saint Gregory's Catholic College in Odd Down, Bath, England is a Roman Catholic, co-educational secondary school with a sixth form. It was renamed from Saint Gregory's Comprehensive School, which opened in 1979. It teaches around 1000 pupils, its current head teacher is Anne Cusack.

The school has specialist status in Performing Arts and Modern Languages. 
In 2008 and 2013, it was rated as "Outstanding" by Ofsted.

There are four houses named after famous saints: Stein, Romero, Bakhita and Francis.

In 2011 the school formed a soft federation with St Mark's CofE School in Larkhall, with St Gregory's former headteacher, Raymond Friel, being appointed as executive headteacher in charge of both schools. The federation built a joint sixth form at St Gregory's, which opened in 2013 with the name The New Sixth.

Saint Gregory's Comprehensive School was formed in 1979 through the amalgamation of Cardinal Newman School located at the site of the new school, and La Sainte Union Convent School founded in 1858 and located on Pulteney Road in central Bath (now Bath Law Courts).

See also
Education in Bath, Somerset

References

External links
Saint Gregory's Catholic College
The New Sixth

Secondary schools in Bath and North East Somerset
Catholic secondary schools in the Diocese of Clifton
Educational institutions established in 1979
1979 establishments in England
Voluntary aided schools in England
Schools in Bath, Somerset